The ligament of apex dentis (or apical odontoid ligament) is a ligament that spans between the second cervical vertebra in the neck and the skull.
It lies as a fibrous cord in the triangular interval between the alar ligaments, which extends from the tip of the odontoid process on the axis to the anterior margin of the foramen magnum, being intimately blended with the deep portion of the anterior atlantooccipital membrane and superior crus of the transverse ligament of the atlas.

It is regarded as a rudimentary intervertebral fibrocartilage, and in it traces of the notochord may persist.

References

External links
 

Ligaments of the head and neck
Bones of the vertebral column